John Francis Moss was the first Clerk to the Sheffield School Board in the 30 years following the 1870 Education Act to create compulsory education in England and Wales for children aged between five and 13, and subsequently known as "The Father of Education in Sheffield".

Early life

John Francis Moss was one of four brothers born to Richard and Elizabeth Moss in Rotherham in 1844. (England & Wales Births 1837–2006, 1851 Census).

His family lived first at Carr House, Greasbrough, on the north side of Rotherham (1851 Census). 
He and his brothers George, Charles Herbert, and Benjamin Moss were educated at one of the earliest schools in Rotherham, the British School near Rawmarsh Road at a time when school education was not a universal right.
By 1861 he had moved with his family to 28, Phoenix Place, Kimberworth (1861 Census).

Career
John F. Moss first served an apprenticeship as a printer in Rotherham before later becoming chief reporter at the Sheffield Daily Telegraph which had been founded in 1855.

John F Moss left his career in journalism behind following the passing of the 1870 Education Act to become Clerk to the newly formed Sheffield Board of Schools.

In his submission to the Statistical Enquiry Committee he stated:

"The town was generating an estimated school population of 42,541. Investigation into the school population
revealed that 17,850 children were in attendance at public elementary schools, 4,504 were being educated in private elementary schools,
while there were some 934 in so-called Dame Schools. In the report, Moss calculated that there was total provision for 31,108 children
and that the deficiency to meet the estimated school population of 42,541 was 11,433.".

In 1872 he registered the Sheffield School Desk Design.

After touring around Europe observing educational practice in other countries he published "Notes on National Education in Continental Europe", 1873

Later on, in 1880, he published "The Handbook of the New Code of Regulations", 1880, John P. Moss [sic] 

He was Clerk to the School Board on the occasion of the opening of the new Firth College by Prince Leopold in 1880 a college to subsequently become part of the University of Sheffield.

A photograph of John Francis Moss can be found at the Picture Sheffield archive.

The work of John Francis Moss in education earned him the unofficial title of the "Father of Education in Sheffield".

On November 28, 1900, to mark the completion of thirty years work as Clerk to the School Board he was presented with portrait of himself, painted by Ernest Moore.

Death
Mr. John F. Moss died in June, 1907, when 62 years old, at his home, Edgebrook
Road.

External links
"Our University, our birthday, our story", the story of Sheffield University rising from Firth College, an college founded whilst John Francis Moss was Clerk to the Sheffield Schools Board.

References

1907 deaths
1844 births
People from South Yorkshire
19th-century British journalists